Conor Lenihan (born 3 March 1963) is an Irish former Fianna Fáil politician who served as a Minister of State from 2004 to 2011. He served as a Teachta Dála (TD) for the Dublin South-West constituency from 1997 to 2011.

He was from 2011 to 2015 a Vice President of the Skolkovo Foundation, the coordination body for a planned high-tech innovation centre on the edge of Moscow, where he worked on international partnership development.

Early and personal life
Lenihan was born in Dublin in 1963. He lived in Athlone until he was 11 years of age. He was educated at Belvedere College, University College Dublin (where he was chair of the Kevin Barry Cumann of Ógra Fianna Fáil), Dublin City University and the INSEAD.

Lenihan began his working life as a newspaper journalist working in the 1980s in the House of Commons in London, where he was a political correspondent for the Irish News. While in London he was also a member of the European Commission's Speakers Panel.

In the 1990s, he went into broadcast journalism working with the Dublin radio station 98FM. Lenihan also worked as a senior executive with O2, an Irish-owned mobile operator, and subsequently worked as an advisor for the company.

Lenihan is the son of former Tánaiste, TD and Minister Brian Lenihan. His grandfather, Patrick Lenihan, also served in the Oireachtas. His aunt, Mary O'Rourke, is a former TD, Senator and Minister, while his brother, Brian Lenihan Jnr was a TD and Minister for Finance from 2008 to 2011 during the Irish economic downturn.

Lenihan was diagnosed with a benign tumour in 2007.

Lenihan was also the editor of The Nation, the official publication of the Fianna Fáil party.

Political career
Lenihan was first elected to the Dáil at the 1997 general election.

In a reshuffle in October 2004, he was appointed by Bertie Ahern as Minister of State at the Department of Foreign Affairs with special responsibility for Overseas Development and Human Rights. Lenihan restructured Ireland's international aid programme, creating Irish Aid, the Irish Government's programme of assistance to developing countries. Through Irish Aid, Lenihan administered a budget of almost a billion euros which is used to help developing nations thus continuing Ireland's tradition of reaching out to other post-colonial nations.

In June 2007, when a new coalition government was formed by Ahern after the election, he was appointed as Minister of State at the Department of Community, Rural and Gaeltacht Affairs, at the Department of Education and Science, and at the Department of Justice, Equality and Law Reform, with responsibility for integration policy. He led a government initiative to deal with large volume immigration into Ireland which culminated with the publication of a new policy statement "Migration Nation". He was reappointed in this role when Brian Cowen succeeded as Taoiseach in May 2008.

In a reshuffle in April 2009, he was appointed as Minister of State at the Department of Enterprise, Trade and Employment, at the Department of Education and Science and at the Department of Communications, Energy and Natural Resources, with special responsibility for Science, Technology, Innovation and Natural Resources. He created a single budget line for science and technology funding as well as participating in the country's Innovation Task Force. As part of his role in the ministry he participated in trade and investment missions, frequently presenting to top global companies who already invest in Ireland or were about to do so. He was a member of the Cabinet Sub-Committee on Economic Recovery.

He lost his seat at the 2011 general election, with his first preference vote declining from 20.5% in 2007 to just 5%. He placed eighth in the poll and was eliminated on the fourth count.

In October 2018, Lenihan announced his intention to seek the Fianna Fáil nomination for the Dublin constituency in the 2019 European Parliament elections. At the party candidate selection meeting in February 2019 Lenihan placed fourth out of four candidates with 108 votes of the 838 ballots cast.

Controversies

Attitude to immigrants
Lenihan was involved in some controversy on 18 May 2005, when off-microphone he told opposition TD Joe Higgins of the Socialist Party that he should "stick to [helping] the kebabs", a reference to the Turkish workers who were making a legal challenge against their employer, GAMA. Lenihan apologised in the Dáil for the remarks.

In 2007, he banned Gardaí and Garda reserves from wearing the Sikh turban, saying "if we are to take integration seriously, people who come here must understand our way of doing things. When the President and Ministers travel to the Middle East, they accept cultural requirements of the country and the culture in which they are operating. It is a vice-versa situation with regard to Ireland".

The Origin of Specious Nonsense
In September 2010, Lenihan attracted controversy when it emerged that he was to attend the launch of The Origin of Specious Nonsense, an anti-evolution book by John J. May. PZ Myers, on his Pharyngula blog, expressed shock that a Minister of State with special responsibility for Science would lend support to such a book. Lenihan claimed that he was "not launching the book as Minister for Science but rather as a TD because May is a constituent of his". In the wake of this controversy, May asked Lenihan not to launch the book "because I am so embarrassed that the Minister for Science has been so insulted" and "eviscerated" on a political website.

Tonight with Vincent Browne
While appearing in March 2011 on Tonight with Vincent Browne on television, presenter Vincent Browne asked if there was "a happy coincidence" between matters of national importance and what Lenihan was personally interested in, leading to what The Irish Times described as "some on-air rage".

Post-political career
In July 2011, Lenihan joined Skolkovo Foundation, a planned scientific and innovation center outside Moscow, Russia. In August 2012, Lenihan joined the board of San Leon Energy, an oil and gas explorer with concessions in Poland, Albania, Morocco and Ireland. He remarried in Moscow in 2013.

References

 

1963 births
Living people
Alumni of Dublin City University
Alumni of University College Dublin
Fianna Fáil TDs
Conor
Members of the 28th Dáil
Members of the 29th Dáil
Members of the 30th Dáil
Ministers of State of the 29th Dáil
Ministers of State of the 30th Dáil
People educated at Belvedere College
People from Athlone
Politicians from County Dublin
Politicians from County Westmeath